David Lee Russell (born January 9, 1960) is an American former professional basketball player. From 1979 to 1983, he played four seasons under Lou Carnesecca and alongside Chris Mullin as a member of the St. John's Red Storm. In his four years, Russell averaged 14.6 points, 6.8 rebounds, and 1.0 assist on 54.6% field goal shooting.

Russell was drafted in the second round, 37th pick overall by the Denver Nuggets in the 1983 NBA draft. He was waived by the team that summer, and never played a game in the NBA.

Russell went on to play six years in the Spanish Basketball League Liga ACB. He played for several teams, averaging 27.1 points, 6.9 rebounds and 0.7 assists on 58% shooting in his 127 games. He retired from professional basketball in 1989. Russell also played briefly for the Columbus Horizon of the Continental Basketball Association (CBA), appearing in five games in the 1991–92 season.

References 

1960 births
Living people
American expatriate basketball people in Spain
American men's basketball players
Basketball players from New York City
Columbus Horizon players
Denver Nuggets draft picks
Liga ACB players
Small forwards
St. John's Red Storm men's basketball players